Kjul is a small village in Akershus, Norway.

Villages in Akershus